Over G Fighters is a combat flight simulation video game for Xbox 360 developed by Taito and released by Ubisoft on 27 June 2006 in North America.

The single player mode revolves around a group of multi-national fighter pilots in the fictional Energy Airforce in the near future. After terrorist outbreaks across the world threaten global security, these few brave pilots lead a spearhead assault against the terrorists. The characters are able to fly most modern day jets found in the Western arsenal, as well as several Russian and European fighter planes. Each character has their own attributes such as a specialty in European, modern, naval, and attack aircraft. The game has a somewhat lengthy campaign mode that lets players immerse themselves in the various theaters of war: dogfights, bombing strikes, secret missions, air support, and naval strike. Unlike other console flight-simulator games, Over G Fighters uses the real names of planes, as well as weapons. Their locations are also real and not a fictional country.  Lastly, it allows real combat situations, running out of fuel, and weapons (in expert, hell, or arena mode).

Multiplayer 
The multiplayer mode can only be used when connected to Xbox Live. The game does not support split-screen local multiplayer modes. Over G Fighters has the following multiplayer modes:
Versus: Consists of two teams of four; each team must down the enemy team's aircraft. (It is also possible to down friendly aircraft).
Arena: Consists of four teams of two; each team must destroy the enemy teams' main base. It is possible to down friendly aircraft and attack enemy aircraft.

Reception

Over G Fighters has received generally unfavorable reviews, criticizing all aspects of the game.

References

External links
The Official Website of Over G Fighters

2006 video games
Combat flight simulators
Xbox 360-only games
Taito games
Flight simulation video games
Xbox 360 games
Video games developed in Japan